The Rough Guide to Salsa is a world music compilation album originally released in 1997. Part of the World Music Network Rough Guides series, the album gives broad coverage to the salsa genre of Latin America, focusing on classic styles. Seven of the fourteen tracks are by Cuban musicians, five are Colombian, and one each is Venezuelan and American. The compilation was produced by Phil Stanton, co-founder of the World Music Network. Liner notes were written by Tom Andrews. This was the first of three similarly named albums: the second was released in 2007; the third, in 2012.

Critical reception

The Album received positive reviews. Raymond McKinney of AllMusic called it a "superb introduction". Michaelangelo Matos of the Chicago Reader felt it went down "as smooth as ice cream", praising its lack of drum machines.

Track listing

References 

1997 compilation albums
World Music Network Rough Guide albums